Pope John Paul I: The Smile of God is a 2006 Italian television movie written and directed by Giorgio Capitani. The film is based on real life events of Roman Catholic Pope John Paul I.

Plot 
Contrary to his father's socialist views, Albino Luciani (the Pope’s birth name) entered the lower seminary in Feltre. After being ordained a priest in 1935, he became a vicar in his home parish. Then, while teaching theology at the seminary, he wrote a doctoral dissertation. In 1958 he became a bishop of Vittorio Veneto, in 1973 a cardinal, and a pope in 1978.

Cast 

 Neri Marcorè as Albino Luciani
  José María Blanco as  Card. Jean-Marie Villot
  Paolo Romano  as Don Diego Lorenzi
 Franco Interlenghi as  Agostino Casaroli
  Imma Colomer Marcet as  Sister Lucia dos Santos
 Gabriele Ferzetti as  Cardinal Giuseppe Siri
 Roberto Citran as  Luigi Tiezzi
 Jacques Sernas as  Paul Marcinkus
 Sergio Fiorentini as Father Gruber
  Alberto Di Stasio as  Gioacchino Muccin 
  Giorgia Bongianni as  Bortola Luciani 
  Giuseppe Antignati as  Cardinal Karol Wojtyła
  Emilio De Marchi  as  Girolamo Bortignon

References

External links

2006 television films
2006 films
Italian drama films
Italian television films
2006 biographical drama films
Films set in the 20th century
Films set in Italy
Italian biographical drama films
Films about popes
Films directed by Giorgio Capitani
Cultural depictions of Pope John Paul I
Cultural depictions of Pope John Paul II
Films scored by Ennio Morricone
2006 drama films
2000s Italian films